Talents for Sale is a South Korean variety show created and broadcast by KBS. It first aired on 6 May 2016. The show borrows ideas from home shopping channels, in which the MCs work together with guests to raise funds for local charities by advertising products created based on the guests' talents.

KBS announced on 12 April 2016 that it has signed a ₩1.62 billion one-year contract (US$1,376,481.6) with a Chinese company for the rights to air the Talents for Sale and another KBS show, Battle Trip, in China. This makes the Talents for Sale the first ever South Korean variety show exported to China prior to its first airing.

Talents for Sale aired at 21:35 (KST) every Fridays on KBS2.

List of episodes

References

External links
  
 

Korean Broadcasting System original programming
South Korean variety television shows
Korean-language television shows
2016 South Korean television series debuts
2016 South Korean television series endings